is a Japanese four-panel dōjin manga series. The manga is written by voice actress Masumi Asano, with art by Kenjiro Hata, and is released under the circle name Hajimemashite. The manga launched at Comiket 81 in December 2011, with further releases at each subsequent Comiket until August 2017. An anime television series adaptation animated by Gonzo aired from July to September 2015.

Plot
The series is centered on three friends who are all rookie voice actresses; Futaba Ichinose, Ichigo Moesaki and Rin Kohana. As the girls go through their individual troubles of working in voice acting, they end up hosting a web radio show together and form the unit, Earphones.

Characters

Main characters

A shy and nervous rookie voice actor, who has a tendency to overthink what kind of performance she should give. In between jobs, she works part-time at a convenience store. She has a stuffed doll called  that she occasionally voices to in order to give herself encouragement (in the anime, Korori-chan is also used to explain the various aspects of the voice acting industry). She is a member in the unit Earphones

A hyperactive girl who often claims to be a princess from a strawberry planet as part of her character. She works part-time jobs which she sometimes gets fired from due to absences. She has a cheerful character that can make Futaba and Rin carried by the atmosphere. She is a member of the unit Earphones

A polite 15-year old girl who does voice roles while also attending junior high school. Although her age is the most young, she has an excellent ability as a voice actress. She also is a part of the unit Earphones.

Aozora Production
: Futaba's senior voice actress from the same agency.
: New manager at Aozora Production who starts off as Futaba's manager and is later put in charge of Earphones.
: Senior manager at Aozora Production.
: Futaba's senior voice actor who was being harsh on her but came to acknowledge her after her performance when they dubbed a foreign horror film together with Rikiya Koyama.

Production staff of Budha Fighter Bodhisattvon
: Producer who scouted Futaba, Ichigo, and Rin to host web radio and form Earphones.
, 
,

Sakuranbo Theater Group
: Rin's childhood friend and classmate who also claimed herself as Rin's first fan.
,

Voice Entertainment
,

Earphones's family
, 
,

Media

Manga
The dōjin manga series, written by Masumi Asano with art by Kenjiro Hata, was first published at Comiket 81 in December 2011 under the Hajimemashite circle label, with subsequent releases sold at each following Comiket.

Anime
An anime television adaptation aired in Japan from July 7 to September 29, 2015. The series was licensed for streaming by Funimation in North America and by AnimeLab in Australia and New Zealand.

Episode list
{|class="wikitable" style="width:100%; margin:auto; background:#FFF;"
|- style="border-bottom: 3px solid #CCF;"
! style="width:3em;"  | No.
! Title
! "Request Corner" theme
! Guest stars
! style="width:10em;" | Original airdate
|-

{{Episode list
| EpisodeNumber   = 3
| Title           = Web Radio
| AltTitle        = Uebbu Rajio
| RAltTitle       =  ()
| Aux1            = "Endless Story" (from C3)
| Aux2            = Yukari Tamura
| OriginalAirDate = 
| ShortSummary    = In the build up to their web radio show, Futaba and the others get the chance to promote the show on a live radio show, which has Yukari Tamura appearing as a guest. When it comes to recording the real thing, however, the girls start to struggle to come up with discussion topics.
}}

|}

Voice actor unit
 is a real life seiyū unit formed of the series' main cast; Rie Takahashi, Yuki Nagaku, and Marika Kouno under Evil Line Records of the King Records label. They continue to release songs and perform live even after the anime Seiyu's Life!'' ended.

References

External links
Anime official website 

Anime series based on manga
Comedy anime and manga
Doujinshi
Funimation
Gonzo (company)
Tokyo MX original programming
Yonkoma